Compass Airlines may refer to:

Compass Airlines (Australia)
Compass Airlines (North America)